Gamull is a surname. Notable people with the surname include:

Francis Gamull (1606–1654), English politician
Gamull Baronets